Lopar is a small village in the City Municipality of Koper in the Littoral region of Slovenia.

The small church in the settlement is dedicated to Saint Rufus and belongs to the Parish of Truške.

References

External links

Lopar on Geopedia

Populated places in the City Municipality of Koper